Kaweah (Yokuts: Gā'wia) is an unincorporated community in Tulare County, California, United States. Kaweah has a post office with ZIP code 93237.

Climate
This region experiences warm hot and dry summers, with no average monthly temperatures above 100 °F.  According to the Köppen Climate Classification system, Kaweah has a warm-summer Mediterranean climate, abbreviated "Csb" on climate maps.

References

Unincorporated communities in Tulare County, California
Unincorporated communities in California